Cedric Demetris (born 25 October 1936) is a Jamaican weightlifter. He competed in the men's light heavyweight event at the 1968 Summer Olympics.

References

1936 births
Living people
Jamaican male weightlifters
Olympic weightlifters of Jamaica
Weightlifters at the 1968 Summer Olympics
Place of birth missing (living people)